Athlone Hospital, also known as Lobatse Hospital, is a government-run district hospital located in Lobatse, Botswana. With bed capacity of 700

History 
Athlone hospital (Athlone DHMT) is considered to be one of the first hospitals in Botswana, located in Lobatse, a town in South-Eastern Botswana, 70 kilometres south of the capital Gaborone, situated in a valley running north towards Gaborone. Considered to be the largest hospital in Lobatse and a teaching hospital for many medical graduates.  It is established in year 1929 and it's a government institution.
The hospital consists of the following departments: internal medicine, pediatrics, gynecology and obstetrics , accident and emergency , radiology , dentistry , ophthalmology.

References

External links 
 Botswana Ministry of Health

Hospital buildings completed in 1929
Hospitals in Botswana
Hospitals established in 1929